The Obice da 75/18 modello 34 was an Italian artillery piece used during World War II.

History 

The Italian army has always had an interest in mountain artillery due to the mountainous terrain of its borders. By the 1930s much of this artillery was obsolescent and overdue for replacement.

In 1934, the Italian firm of Ansaldo produced a new mountain howitzer design, the Obice da 75/18 modello 34, designed by Lt. Colonel Sergio Berlese who served in the Italian artillery. The modello 34 could be broken down into eight loads for transport. In the interest of standardization and logistics a version of the 75/18, the modello 35, was also used as the light howitzer component of normal field batteries. The modello 35 did not break down into smaller loads and had a split, rather than box, trail.

The Italians sold the modello 35 abroad in order to obtain foreign currency. In 1940 a sizable batch was sold to Portugal, and more went to South American countries in exchange for raw materials. The gun was also used as the main armament of the Semovente 75/18 self-propelled gun where, due to its "Effetto Pronto" (HEAT) ammunition, it also had a good anti-tank capability.

In 1941 some captured pieces were used against the Germans by the forces of the Commonwealth during the Battle of Crete and were probably present in the defence of Maleme airfield. Two of them are currently displayed next to the Battle of Crete monument in Heraklion.

See also
 Cannone da 75/32 modello 37

References

Modello 34 on Builders Paradise
Modello 35 on "Comando Supremo" website
Obice da 75/18 on "Italie 1935-45" website

World War II mountain artillery
World War II artillery of Italy
World War II field artillery
75 mm artillery
Gio. Ansaldo & C. artillery
Military equipment introduced in the 1930s